Hume is a suburb of Canberra in the District of Jerrabomberra. The suburb is named after the explorer Hamilton Hume and streets are named after Australian industrialists and businessmen. Hume is a light-industrial suburb and there is no significant housing development. The location of the prison has also given Hume a highly unusual gender ratio with 92.7% of the permanent population being male.

Geology

Deakin Volcanics from the Silurian period underlie Hume. Cream and purple rhyodacite are found in the south and including Tralee, New South Wales. A mixture of purple and green tuff, ashstone, shale, and coarse sandstone is in the north east. Coarse dark purple rhyodacite is in the north end near Queanbeyan turn off.

See also 
 Mugga Lane Solar Park

Footnotes

References

Place names search, Geoscience Australia

Suburbs of Canberra